The Garden of Earthly Delights is a painting by Hieronymus Bosch.

Garden of Earthly Delights may also refer to:

Film and theatre
 The Garden of Earthly Delights (1981 film), a film by Stan Brakhage
 The Garden of Earthly Delights (2004 film), a 2004 film by Lech Majewski
 The Garden of Earthly Delights (play), a 1985 Drama Desk Award for Unique Theatrical Experience award-winning play

Literature 
 A Garden of Earthly Delights, a 1967 novel by Joyce Carol Oates

Music 
 "Garden of Earthly Delights", a song by XTC from the album Oranges & Lemons
 "The Garden of Earthly Delights", a song by The United States of America from their self-titled album
 The Garden of Earthly Delights, a 1998 orchestral work by Michael Berkeley
 "The Garden of Earthly Delight", a song by Snakefinger from the album Manual of Errors
 "The Garden of Earthly Delights", a song by SPK from the album "Digitalis Ambigua: Gold & Poison"
 “The Garden Of Earthly Delights”, a song by Uriel from the album Arzachel
 "The Garden (of Unearthly Delights)", a progressive rock song by Unitopia

See also 
 The Garden of Unearthly Delights, a 1995 novel by Robert Rankin
 The Garden of Unearthly Delights (album), an album by British band Cathedral
 Garden of Delights (disambiguation)